Spring Creek, in Sonoma County, California, is a  stream that rises in the northern part of the Sonoma Mountains within Annadel State Park, draining the western slopes of Bennett Mountain and feeding into Matanzas Creek at Doyle Community Park below the Matanzas Creek Reservoir.

The waters of Spring Creek ultimately reach the Pacific Ocean just south of Jenner, California, by way of Matanzas Creek, Santa Rosa Creek, the Laguna de Santa Rosa, Mark West Creek, and the Russian River.

Gallery

References

See also

Lake Ralphine
List of watercourses in the San Francisco Bay Area
Pomo people
Spring Lake Regional Park

Rivers of Sonoma County, California
Sonoma Mountains
Tributaries of the Russian River (California)
Rivers of Northern California